Laura is a traditionally feminine given name in Europe and the Americas, of Latin origin, whose meaning ("bay laurel") is a metonym for a victor, and an early hypocorism from Laurel and Lauren.

Origin and usage 
The name Laura is the feminized form of laurus, Latin for "bay laurel plant", which in the Greco-Roman era was used as a symbol of victory, honor or fame. The name represents the embodiment of victory and strength. The name Daphne, derived from Ancient Greek, carries the same meaning.

Popularity 

In British North America, the name Laura reached 17th most popular in 1880 and 1882, but dropped to #43 in 1899.  It was among the top 50 names for female newborns for much of the early 20th century in the United States, but dropped to #100–120 between 1930 and 1950; reached #10 in 1969, and has since steadily decreased in popularity.

In Europe, Laura remains popular. In 2009 it ranked within the top 10 in Austria, Belgium, Croatia, Denmark, Estonia, Greenland, Luxembourg, Spain, and Switzerland.

Laura is occasionally conflated with Lara, which has different origins and is listed separately on name popularity lists.

Variants 
 Lára: Icelandic
 Lara: Turkish
 Laoura (Λάουρα): Greek
 Laura: Catalan, Croatian, Czech, Danish, Dutch, English, Estonian, Finnish, French, German, Hungarian, Italian, Latvian, Lithuanian, Norwegian, Polish, Portuguese, Romanian, Russian, Slovak, Slovene, Spanish, Swedish, Albanian
 Laure: French
 Lavra: Slovene
 Lora: English, Bulgarian
 Lowri: Welsh

Notable people with the name

Religion
Saint Laura, Spanish martyr

Academics
 Laura Poantă, Romanian physician, writer and artist, professor at Iuliu Hațieganu University of Medicine and Pharmacy
 Laura Wright, professor of English at Western Carolina University
 Laura Waller, professor at University of California, Berkeley of Electrical Engineering and Computer Sciences
 Laura Schulz, professor of cognitive science, Massachusetts Institute of Technology

Artists
 Laura Rodig (1901–1972), Chilean painter, sculptor, illustrator, educator

Celebrities
 Laura Anderson, Scottish television personality
 Laura Ashley, British fashion designer
 Laura Biagiotti, Italian fashion designer
 Laura Calder, Canadian chef and host of program French Food at Home, from Food Network Canada
 Laura Deming, American businesswoman
 Laura Lang, American businesswoman
 Laura Mercier, French make-up artist in the cosmetics business
 Laura Neri, Italian-Greek director
 Laura Schlessinger, American radio talk show host known as Dr. Laura
 Laura Schwartz, American political commentator
 Laura Secord, Canadian heroine in the War of 1812

Entertainers
 L'Aura, Italian singer
 Laura Allen, American actress
 Laura Bailey (model), English model
 Laura Bailey (voice actress), American voice actress
 Laura Benanti, American actress
 Laura Bertram, Canadian actress
 Laura Birn, Finnish actress
 Laura Branigan, American singer
 Laura Breckenridge, American actress
 Laura Bryan Birn, American actress
 Laura Bryna, American country music singer
 Laura Bell Bundy, American actress
 Laura Carmichael, English actress
 Laura Christensen, Danish actress
 Laura Connor, British ballet dancer
 Laura Dern, American actress
 Laura Dickinson, American actress
 Laura Donnelly, British actress
Laura Esterman, American actress
 Laura Fygi, Dutch singer
 Laura Gemser, Indonesian-Dutch actress
 Laura Gómez (actress), American actress
 Laura Harrier, American actress and model
 Laura Harring, Mexican-American actress
 Laura Hope Crews, American actress
 Laura Innes, American actress
 Laura Izibor, Irish musician
 Laura Jane Grace, American singer for the band Against Me!
 Laura Johnson, American actress
 Laura Kampf, German YouTuber, designer, and craftswoman
 Laura Kightlinger, American actress
 Laura Linney, American actress
 Laura MacFarlane, Scottish musician, singer and songwriter
 Laura Macrì, Italian singer
 Laura Main, Scottish actress
 Laura Malmivaara, Finnish actress
 Laura Marano, American actress and singer
 Laura Marling, English singer
 Laura Mennell, Canadian actress
 Laura Morante, Italian actress
 Laura Neiva, Brazilian actress
 Laura Nyro, American singer-songwriter
 Laura Okmin, American sportscaster and NFL on Fox sideline reporter
 Laura Omloop, Belgian singer, yodeler and Junior Eurovision representative
 Laura Osnes, American actress
 Laura Pausini, Italian singer-songwriter
 Laura Põldvere, Estonian singer
 Laura Prepon, American actress, That '70s Show
 Laura Ramsey, American actress
 Laura Regan, Canadian actress
 Laura Rutledge, American beauty pageant titleholder, sportscaster and ESPN College Football sideline reporter
 Laura San Giacomo, American actress
 Laura Sánchez (model), Spanish model
 Laura Shigihara, American singer-songwriter
 Laura Spencer (actress) (born 1986), American actress
 Laura Stoica, Romanian singer and actress
 Laura Vandervoort, Canadian actress
 Laura Veirs, American singer-songwriter
 Laura White, British actress
 Laura Whitmore, Irish presenter
 Laura Witherspoon, American actress
 Laura Wright, American actress

Law
 Laura Codruţa Kövesi, former Prosecutor-General of Romania
 Laura E. Gómez, Mexican-American law professor, University of New Mexico
 Laura Wasser, American attorney

Nobility
Laura Margherita Mazzarini (1608–1685), Italian noblewoman
Laura de Noves, 14th-century French noblewoman, perhaps the subject of love poetry by Petrarch

Politics
 Laura Baird, American politician
 Laura Balbo, Italian sociologist and politician
 Laura Boldrini, Italian politician
 Laura Borràs, Catalan politician
 Laura Bromet, Dutch politician
 Laura Bush, First Lady of the United States from January 20, 2001 to January 20, 2009
 Laura Chinchilla, 49th President of Costa Rica
 Laura Clay, American suffragist
 Laura Garza, American politician
 Laura Garza Galindo, Mexican politician
 Laura Grimond, British politician
 Laura Kelly, 48th governor of Kansas
 Laura Loomer, American activist
 Laura Miller, 58th Mayor of Dallas (2002–2007)
 Laura Moffatt, British MP (1997–2010)
 Laura Pidcock, British MP (2017–2019)
 Laura Pollán, Cuban dissident
 Laura Sandys, British MP (2010–2015)
 Laura Smith, British MP (2017–2019)
 Laura Trott, British MP (2019–present)
 Laura Vilagrà (born 1976), Catalan politician

Science and technology
 Laura Ahtime, statistician from the Seychelles
 Laura Bassi (1711–1778), Italian physicist
 Laura Berman, American sex therapist
Laura J. Esserman, American surgeon and oncologist

Sports
 Laura Benkarth, German footballer and goalkeeper
 Laura Berg, American head college softball coach
 Laura Brown (cyclist), Canadian cyclist
 Laura Brown (golfer), American golfer
 Laura Dahlmeier, German biathlete
 Laura Davies, English golfer
 Laura Davies (bodybuilder), Canadian bodybuilder
 Laura Davis (swimmer), American female medley swimmer
 Laura Davis (volleyball), American volleyball player
 Laura del Colle, Argentine floor hockey player
 Laura Douglas (athlete), Welsh hammer thrower
 Laura Gil, Spanish basketball player
 Laura Gómez (judoka), Spanish judoka
 Laura Heyrman, Belgian volleyball player
 Laura Hodges, Australian professional basketball player
 Laura Kenny, British cyclist
 Laura Malcolm (born 1991), English netball player
 Laura Nicholls (basketball), Spanish basketball player
 Laura Nicholls (swimmer), Canadian former competition swimmer
 Laura Robson, British tennis player
 Laura Sánchez (diver), Mexican diver
 Laura Sánchez (swimmer), Mexican swimmer
 Laura Siegemund, German tennis player
 Laura Taylor (born 1999), Australian swimmer
 Laura Walker, Canadian curler
 Laura Zeng, American rhythmic gymnast

Writers and journalists
 Laura Brown (fashion journalist), American fashion journalist
 Laura J. Burns, American author
 Laura Dayton Fessenden (1852–1924), American author
 Laura Eldridge, American women's health writer and activist
 LauraMaery Gold, American author
 Laura Goode, American novelist
 Laura Hillman (1923–2020), German-born American memoirist, Holocaust survivor and "Schindler Jew"
 Laura Ingalls Wilder, American author of Little House on the Prairie
 Laura M. Johns (1849–1935), American suffragist and journalist
 Laura Kuenssberg, British journalist, BBC political correspondent
 Laura Ling, American journalist
 Laura Mestre Hevia (1867–1944), Cuban translator, humanist and writer
 Laura Miller (journalist), Scottish broadcast journalist
 Laura Miller (writer), American author
 Laura Resnick, American writer
 Laura Villanueva Rocabado (pseudonym, Hilda Mundy; 1912–1980), Bolivian writer, poet, journalist
 Laura Thompson (journalist), Canadian musician and CBC reporter and producer
 Laura Tingle, Australian journalist and author, ABC chief political correspondent
 Laura Rosamond White (1844-1922), American author

Fictional characters 
 Laura, an anesthesiologist from the television series In Treatment
 Laura Harris, the protagonist of the video game D
 Laura Lewis, the protagonist of the video game Enemy Zero
 Laura, a young girl in the Silent Hill video game franchise
 Laura Parton, the protagonist of the video game D2
 Laura, a female lead character in Brick
 Laura, a main character in the Sheridan Le Fanu 1871 novel Carmilla and its adaptations, including the webseries of the same name
 Laura Alden, a character in Wolf
 Laura Bristow, an alias for Irina Derevko, the mother of Sydney Bristow on the television series Alias
 Laura Carrot, a character in VeggieTales
 Laura Diamond, protagonist of the television series The Mysteries of Laura
 Laura Hardy (Hardy Boys), mother from the Hardy Boys series of books
 Laura Haruna (aka Hiroko), a character from the anime series Hamtaro
 Laura Horton, a former character on the soap opera Days of Our Lives
 Laura Hunt, the protagonist of Otto Preminger's 1944 film Laura
 Laura Kinney, also known as X-23, a Marvel Comics character
 Laura Palmer, from the television series Twin Peaks
 Laura Parker, an English model in Sarra Manning's Fashionistas book series.
 Laura Petrie, a character from the American sitcom The Dick Van Dyke Show, played by Mary Tyler Moore
 Laura Roslin, from the reimagined television series Battlestar Galactica
 Laura Spencer, a character on the soap opera General Hospital
 Laura Winslow, a character from the American sitcom Family Matters
 Laura Gauthier, a recurring character from the incomplete French TV series, Code Lyoko: Evolution
 Laure Berthaud, main character of French crime series Engrenages
 Laura Matsuda, a character from the Street Fighter V
 Laura Sorkin, a scientist from the video game Jurassic Park: The Game

Name days 
Christian name days for Laura:
 January 15: Sweden
 January 18: Estonia, Finland
 January 22: France
 April 18: Latvia
 June 1: Czech Republic
 June 5: Slovakia, Slovenia
 June 17: Hungary, Lithuania, Poland
 August 10: Austria, Germany
 October 19: Lithuania, Italy, Spain, England

See also 
 Laura (disambiguation)

References

External links 
 

English feminine given names
Estonian feminine given names
Feminine given names
German feminine given names
Italian feminine given names
Latvian feminine given names
Lithuanian feminine given names
Romanian feminine given names
Spanish feminine given names
French feminine given names
Finnish feminine given names
Hungarian feminine given names
Polish feminine given names
Given names derived from plants or flowers